Shelby Labs is an American politician. She is a Republican member of the Pennsylvania House of Representatives, representing the 143rd district in Bucks County since 2021.

Biography
Labs graduated from Central Bucks High School West in 2005, and received a BA in communications from Temple University in 2009.

In 2020, Labs was elected to the Pennsylvania House of Representatives representing the 143rd district, which is part of Bucks County. She defeated incumbent Democratic representative Wendy Ullman with 51.5% of the vote in the general election.

Labs currently sits on the Commerce, Game & Fisheries Human Services, and Urban Affairs committees.

References

External links
Pennsylvania House of Representatives profile
Campaign website

Living people
Republican Party members of the Pennsylvania House of Representatives
21st-century American women politicians
Women in Pennsylvania politics
Women state legislators in Pennsylvania
21st-century American politicians
Year of birth missing (living people)